Elton is a suburb of Bury, Greater Manchester, England. The population at the 2011 census was 11,464. The River Irwell flows through the area via Burrs Country Park, formerly cotton mills, some features of which are still visible.

Elton is a halt on the East Lancashire Railway heritage line.

References 

Areas of Greater Manchester
Bury, Greater Manchester